"Die with You" is a song by American recording artist Beyoncé. She originally released the song in 2015, for her seventh wedding anniversary, along with a music video of her performing at a piano and wearing a baseball cap. On April 4, 2017, she released another video for the song to commemorate her and Jay-Z's nine-year anniversary. The new video, available only on Tidal, features home footage.

Composition
An R&B ballad, "Die with You" is written in the key of A major with a tempo of 106 beats per minute in  time. Beyoncé's vocals span from D3 to E5 in the song.

Charts

Release history

References

2015 songs
Beyoncé songs
Songs written by Beyoncé
Songs written by Kirby Lauryen